The Guarujá Formation is a geological formation of the Santos Basin offshore of the Brazilian states of Rio de Janeiro, São Paulo, Paraná and Santa Catarina. The formation is the second-most important post-salt reservoir rock of the Santos Basin.

Etymology 
The formation is named after the city of Guarujá, São Paulo.

Description 
These facies are interbedded with the alluvial clastics of the Florianópolis Formation. The Guarujá name is restricted to the lowest limestone intercalation, previously named Lower Guarujá by Ojeda and Ahranha in Pereira and Feijó (1994). The microfacies indicate a tidal flat to shallow lagoon and open carbonate platform depositional environment. The age based on planktonic foraminifera and pollen is Early Albian.

Petroleum geology 
The formation is the second-most important post-salt reservoir rock of the Santos Basin, after the Itajaí-Açu Formation.

See also 

 Campos Basin

References

Bibliography 
 
 
 
 
 
 

Geologic formations of Brazil
Santos Basin
Cretaceous Brazil
Lower Cretaceous Series of South America
Albian Stage
Limestone formations
Marl formations
Tidal deposits
Lagoonal deposits
Shallow marine deposits
Reservoir rock formations
Petroleum in Brazil
Formations
Formations
Formations
Formations
Tupi–Guarani languages